Étoile de Casablanca is a Moroccan football club currently playing in the fourth division. The club is located in the town of Casablanca. It was founded in 1942 and plays their home games in the Stage Père Jégo.

Honours

Moroccan Championship: 1
1959

References

Football clubs in Morocco
Football clubs in Casablanca
Sports clubs in Morocco